Fear No Love is the fourth studio album by Bob Ostertag, released on February 18, 1995 by Avant Records. The album's concept deals with the phobias surrounding queer love including fear of intimacy, fear of gender, fear of stereotypes, fear of AIDS, fear of rejection and fear of fear.

Reception

Dean McFarlane of AllMusic noted the surrealism and black humor of Fear No Love and awarded the album three and a half out of five stars, saying "those expecting a heady avant-garde experiment may be shocked to find this record to be a hilarious plunderphonic sampling attack on disco,techno, and R&B music." The Wire gave the album a positive review, saying "Ostertag's method of computeranatomising his colleagues' contributions into samples and mechanically constructing songs out of them is more than usually redundant on this only mildly diverting, dirty talking and dotty pseudofunk outing." The Advocate said "there's an intensely homo sense of humor and humanity at work that enlivens the experimentation."

Track listing

Personnel
Adapted from the Fear No Love liner notes.

Musicians
 Trevor Dunn – bass guitar (1, 3, 4)
 Fred Frith – bass guitar (2, 4, 6))
 Bob Ostertag – programming, arrangements, sampler (1, 2, 3, 5), bass guitar (1, 4), drums (1, 5), midi drums (2-4), synthesizer (2, 4, 6), guitar (2, 4), MIDI keyboard (1), percussion (1), midi bass (5), midi percussion (6)
 J. D. Reilley – keyboards (1, 2, 4, 6)

Additional musicians
 Joey Blake – backing vocals (6)
 Justin Bond – vocals (2, 4)
 Lynn Breedlove – vocals (3, 4)
 Chris Brown – sampler (3)
 Fred Frith – guitar (2, 5)
 Jim Hedges – guitar (1, 2)
 Philip Horvitz – vocals (4)
 Christian Huygen – vocals (1)
 Raz Kennedy – backing vocals (6)
 Andrea Lewis – backing vocals (1), vocals (5)
 Mike Patton – vocals (2, 4)
 Annie Toone – harmonica (4, 5)
 Richie Waits – vocals (5)
 William Winant – percussion (2)

Production and design
 Phyllis Christopher – photography
 Disk Union – executive-producer
 Pamela August Russell – photography
 Alex Stahl – mixing
 Kazunori Sugiyama – associate producer
 John Zorn – executive-producer

Release history

References

External links 
 Fear No Love at Bandcamp
 

1995 albums
Bob Ostertag albums
Avant Records albums
LGBT-related albums